The 1957–58 season was the 78th season of competitive football in England.

The season ended with Wolverhampton Wanderers as First Division champions after scoring 103 goals and Bolton Wanderers as FA Cup winners. However, the season is remembered most for the Munich air disaster which occurred on 6 February 1958 and involved Manchester United on the return flight from a European Cup quarter-final win in Yugoslavia; 23 people died as a result of their injuries in the crash, including eight of the club's players.

Overview

At the end of the season, Sunderland were relegated for the first time in their history. This was the last season to feature a regionalised Third Division. At the end of the season, the teams finishing between 2nd and 12th in the North and South divisions were placed in the new national Third Division, with the remainder being transferred to the new Fourth Division.

Diary of the season
31 August 1957: The Manchester derby at Old Trafford sees United beat City 4–1 with goals from Duncan Edwards, Tommy Taylor, Johnny Berry and Dennis Viollet.

18 September 1957: In the First Division, Nottingham Forest beat Burnley 7–0, the first time they have scored seven without reply since 1950 in the Third Division South.

28 September 1957: Wolverhampton Wanderers beat Manchester United at home 3–1 with two goals from Dennis Wilshaw and one from Norman Deeley.

10 October 1957: The England squad to face Wales is announced, and features three newcomers. They are Bolton Wanderers goalkeeper Eddie Hopkinson, Blackburn Rovers' Bryan Douglas and Don Howe of West Bromwich Albion.

16 November 1957: Wolverhampton Wanderers lose their 100% home record to local rivals West Bromwich Albion in a 1–1 draw. Until then the home team had won eight successive home games, scoring 27 goals and conceding only five.

1 December 1957: Harry Gregg becomes the world's most expensive goalkeeper after joining Manchester United from Doncaster Rovers for a fee of £23,500.

7 December 1957: Everton's Dave Hickson is sent off from their all-North West clash with Manchester City.

13 December 1957: Evertonian Tony McNamara heads across Stanley Park to join Liverpool.

25 December 1957: Tottenham Hotspur in their 1–0 home victory become only the second team (Everton did so in the first game of the season) in the whole season to prevent Wolverhampton Wanderers from scoring.

3 January 1958: Liverpool add "much-wanted" Hibs inside forward Jimmy Harrower to their ranks, paying a fee that "tops £10,000".

9–10 January 1958: Dave Hickson is suspended by The Football Association for 21 days, with their disciplinary committee taking into account "the player’s record on previous misconduct"; Everton order him not to comment.

15 January 1958: Manchester United manager Matt Busby accepts an offer to become manager of the Scotland national football team, while attending the under-23 international at Goodison Park between England and Scotland. Reports suggest Busby will assume command before the match between Scotland and a Scottish Football League XI on 3 February.

1 February 1958: A thrilling First Division match at Highbury sees Manchester United defeat Arsenal 5–4.

5 February 1958: Manchester United reach the European Cup semi-finals with a 3–3 draw (5–4 win on aggregate) in the quarter-final second leg against Red Star Belgrade in Yugoslavia.

6 February 1958: The Manchester United team plane crashes at Munich Airport in West Germany. 21 people are killed, including seven of the team's players (Roger Byrne, Geoff Bent, Eddie Colman, Bill Whelan, Tommy Taylor, David Pegg and Mark Jones) and three club officials (secretary Walter Crickmer, coach Tom Curry and trainer Bert Whalley). Also among the dead is journalist Frank Swift, the former Manchester City and England goalkeeper. Ten other players are injured, with doctors being particularly concerned about the conditions of winger Johnny Berry and left-half Duncan Edwards. Manager Matt Busby is also seriously injured.

19 February 1958: In their first game since the Munich air disaster, Manchester United (with a side mostly made up of reserve players) defeat Sheffield Wednesday 3–0 in the FA Cup fifth round at Old Trafford. However, the victory is overshadowed by news from Munich that the condition of Duncan Edwards has deteriorated once more.

21 February 1958: 21-year-old Duncan Edwards dies in hospital from injuries sustained fifteen days ago in the Munich air disaster.

13 March 1958: Liverpool's leading goalscorer, Tony Rowley, signs for Tranmere Rovers.

12 April 1958: Woking win the FA Amateur Cup after victory over Ilford in the final 3–0, in front of a young Martin Tyler.

26 April 1958: Wolverhampton Wanderers are crowned champions after scoring their 103rd goal of the season, but are beaten by already-relegated Sheffield Wednesday in their last league game of the season, while in the Second Division the Anglo-Welsh derby between Bristol City and Swansea Town goes the way of Swansea. Meanwhile, two England representative teams are in action, as the schoolboys win 3–1 over their Scottish equivalents at Wembley Stadium in front of 90,000, while the England amateurs drew 1–1 against France.

3 May 1958: Nat Lofthouse scores both goals as Bolton Wanderers beat Manchester United 2–0 in the Final at Wembley to win the FA Cup for the fourth time.

Notable debutants

24 August 1957: Jimmy Greaves, 17-year-old forward, scores once on his debut for Chelsea in a First Division fixture against Tottenham Hotspur.

28 September 1957: Gerry Byrne, 19-year-old left-back, makes his debut for illness-ravaged Liverpool.

21 December 1957: Kenny Morgans, 18-year-old winger, makes his debut for Manchester United in First Division home match against Leicester City.

19 February 1958: Shay Brennan, 20-year-old winger, scores twice on his debut for Manchester United as they beat Sheffield Wednesday 3–0 in the FA Cup third round, their first game after the Munich air disaster.

Honours

Notes = Number in parentheses is the times that club has won that honour. * indicates new record for competition

Awards
Football Writers' Association
 Footballer of the Year – Danny Blanchflower (Tottenham Hotspur)
Top goalscorer
 Bobby Smith (Tottenham Hotspur), 36

Football League

First Division
The First Division title went to Wolves, still captained by Billy Wright and managed by Stan Cullis. Preston North End finished runners-up, while Tottenham Hotspur finished third thanks largely to the influence of captain and Footballer of the Year, Danny Blanchflower. West Bromwich Albion finished fourth and the top five was completed by Manchester City, who became the first and so far only club to both score and concede 100 goals in a league season. After the Munich air disaster, Manchester United won only one more league game and dropped to ninth place, although they did reach the FA Cup final, where they were beaten by Bolton Wanderers.

Sheffield Wednesday propped up the First Division and were the first side to be relegated, being joined soon after by a Sunderland side who had been in the First Division for nearly seventy years.

Second Division
West Ham United topped the Second Division to secure First Division football for the first time in the postwar era, while Blackburn Rovers finished one point behind them in second place. Charlton Athletic missed out on an immediate return to the First Division by a single point, while Liverpool missed out on promotion by two points. With six games remaining in the season, Lincoln City looked certain to be relegated - five points adrift of the club above them, and having won only five matches all season. Incredibly they won their last six matches to escape relegation by a single point.

Third Division North
Scunthorpe & Lindsey United sealed the Third Division North title by a comfortable margin and secured their place in the Second Division, while runners-up Accrington Stanley had the consolation of at least being able to play in the third of the league's fourth tiers following the decision to reorganise into four national divisions for the 1958–59 season.

Third Division South
Brighton & Hove Albion won promotion to the Second Division as champions of the Third Division South.

Top goalscorers

First Division
Bobby Smith (Tottenham Hotspur) – 36 goals

Second Division
Tommy Johnston (Leyton Orient / Blackburn Rovers) – 43 goals

Third Division North
Alf Ackerman (Carlisle United) – 35 goals

Third Division South
Derek Reeves (Southampton) and Sammy McCrory (Southend United) – 31 goals

References